Athanasios Lefkaditis  (1872 in Athens-June 18, 1944 in Athens) was the founder of Greek Scouting.

Lefkaditis was born in 1872 to parents from Argostoli on Cephalonia in the Ionian Islands in western Greece. In 1899 he received his professional physical education teaching license. His love for sports led him to become director of the Panhellenic Gymnastics Association working with professor Dimitris Makris (Δημήτρης Μακρής).

During the 1908 Summer Olympics in London, as a member of the Greek delegation, Lefkaditis observed with interest the British Scouts' service and activities at the Games. He met with Robert Baden-Powell and shortly after, introduced Scouting in Greece in 1910.

In November 1910 he founded the first group of Greek Scouts with Dimitris Makris. He was memorialized in 1963 on a postage stamp of Greece for the occasion of the 11th World Scout Jamboree, held 1–11 August 1963 in Marathon, Greece.

References

External links
 Ο Αθανάσιος Λευκαδίτης στη Σχολή Ι.Μ.Παναγιωτόπουλου

1872 births
1944 deaths
Scouting and Guiding in Greece
Panellinios